Crerar is a Scottish surname. The original name is the Scots version of the Gaelic criathar meaning Sievewright.
The surname Crerar was first found in Inverness and the surrounding Scottish highlands, where the Crerars held a family seat from ancient times. The Crerars are a sect of Clan Macintosh.

People 
 Duncan MacGregor Crerar (1836–1916), Scottish poet
 Finlay Crerar (1904-1965), RAF officer
 George Crerar (1914–1987), President of the SRU and Scottish sportsman
 Harry Crerar (1888–1965), Canadian World War II commander
 John Crerar (1750–1840), Scottish gamekeeper and composer
 John Crerar (1827–1899), American industrialist
 Peter Crerar (1785–1856), Scots-Canadian civil engineer
 Thomas Crerar (1876–1975), Canadian politician

Places 
 Crerar, Ontario, a neighborhood of Hamilton, Ontario named for the Canadian general Harry Crerar
 John Crerar Library, a library operated by the University of Chicago named for the American industrialist John Crerar

References 

English-language surnames
Scottish surnames